Sexualization, Media, and Society (SMS) is a peer-reviewed, interdisciplinary open-access academic journal, published by SAGE, to provide a resource for diverse scholars and activists interested in critically examining the phenomenon of sexualized media as it affects individuals, relationships, communities, and societies.

The journal was founded in 2015 by co-editors Ana Bridges (University of Arkansas), Deirdre M. Condit (Virginia Commonwealth University), Gail Dines (Wheelock College), Jennifer A. Johnson (Virginia Commonwealth University), and Carolyn West (University of Washington Tacoma).

References

External links 
 

English-language journals
Gender studies journals
Publications established in 2015
SAGE Publishing academic journals
Sexology journals
Media studies journals
Women's health
Women's studies journals